Choice Hotels International, Inc. is an American multinational hospitality company based in Rockville, Maryland. The company, which is one of the largest hotel chains in the world, owns several hotel brands ranging from upscale to economy. As of 2020, Choice Hotels franchises more than 7,100 hotels in more than 40 countries and territories worldwide, representing nearly 600,000 rooms, in addition to 1,035 hotels under construction with more than 85,000 rooms.

History

Founding and early years
Quality Courts United, Inc., which began as a nonprofit referral chain of seven motels in Florida, was founded in 1939. It would undergo several name changes before becoming what is known today as Choice Hotels International. The chain initially remained east of the Mississippi River.

By the early 1960s, Quality Courts United had approximately 600 members. All of its hotels needed to meet certain quality standards and offer amenities like air conditioning, telephones, swimming pools, paved driveways, and wall-to-wall carpeting. In 1963, the organization became a for-profit corporation and changed its name to Quality Courts Motels, Inc.

In 1957, Stewart W. Bainum Sr., who ran a Washington, D.C., plumbing business, opened his first hotel in Silver Spring, Maryland. He later franchised his first Quality Courts motel in 1963. In 1968, Bainum merged his business, Park Consolidated Motels, Inc., with Quality Courts Motels, assumed the role of president and CEO, and moved the company's headquarters from Daytona Beach to Silver Spring, Maryland.

Lodging Magazine wrote that, by 1969, Quality Courts Motels was the world's "largest association of independent motel operators".

Growth and expansion

The company changed its name to Quality Inns International in 1972 and, in 1990, the parent company became known as Choice Hotels International.

In the 1980s, the company started the industry's first market segmentation strategy, using a range of hotel brands across price points. Geographically, it expanded across the country by opening hotels in the west.

The Comfort brand, which would later become Choice Hotels' flagship brand, was established in 1981. The brand was marketed to family vacationers, business travelers, and senior citizens to compete with Days Inn, Best Western, and Friendship Inn. The company's Quality Inn hotels remained in the midscale segment, competing with Holiday Inn, Ramada, Howard Johnson, and Travelodge. The now-discontinued Quality Royale brand was positioned as Choice Hotels' upscale brand, designed to compete with Marriott, Hyatt, Hilton, and Sheraton; Quality Royale would eventually be rebranded as Clarion. In the 1980s, Choice bought Friendship Inn, Rodeway Inn, and Econo Lodge.

In 1989, the company introduced McSleep, an economy brand utilizing a consistent, interior-corridor design prototype designed by Rob Spurr that was all new construction. The name was soon changed to Sleep Inn following litigation from McDonald's.

Bainum's other business, Manor Care, Inc., which owned and managed nursing homes, bought Choice Hotels in 1990. The company later spun off its hotels business in 1996. Bainum Sr. led Choice Hotels International until 1987, when his son, Stewart W. Bainum Jr., took over the role of chairman and chief executive. As of 2018, Bainum Jr. remains chairman of Choice Hotels.

Choice Hotels International became publicly traded in 1996. That same year, it announced the establishment of the MainStay Suites brand, a midscale extended-stay hotel.

In the mid-2000s, Choice Hotels expanded into the upscale hotel market. The company announced in 2005 the creation of its Cambria Hotels & Suites brand, later renamed Cambria Hotels, the company's first new brand since MainStay Suites's creation in 1996. The Cambria brand was created as an upscale hotel chain marketed to business travelers. , the Cambria brand had expanded to about 100 hotels open or in the pipeline, including hotels in Philadelphia, Dallas, New Orleans, South Windsor, Connecticut and Savannah, Georgia.

In 2008, Choice Hotels was the first industry chain to establish a "soft brand", Ascend Hotel Collection. The Ascend Hotel Collection includes upscale boutique and historic hotels whose owners are subject to fewer fixed brand standards compared with Choice's other brands.

Recent history

Choice Hotels began a transformation of its Comfort properties in 2012, with the company removing its franchising from 600 properties that did not meet Choice Hotels’ new standards. Choice Hotels rebranded Comfort in 2018, which brought its Comfort Inn, Comfort Inn & Suites, and Comfort Suites brands under one umbrella. Some of the Comfort properties that didn't meet Choice's standards for the brand were rebranded under the Quality Inn brand, as Comfort and Quality swapped market positions within Choice's hierarchy.

In October 2010, officials in Maryland and Montgomery County announced that Choice Hotels International would move its headquarters from Silver Spring, to a new  facility in Rockville Town Center in Rockville. Groundbreaking occurred in August 2011, and Choice Hotels completed the move into the new headquarters in June 2013.

Throughout its history, Choice Hotels introduced new features into the hotel industry, including having all hotels include non-smoking rooms, 24-hour-a-day toll-free reservations, Internet-based property management systems, and the industry's first iPhone application. The company's technological developments also led it to create a division called SkyTouch Technology in 2013, which markets Choice Hotels' property management system to other hotel companies.

In 2014, Choice Hotels invested millions of dollars to begin a multi-year process to develop the industry's first new global reservations system and distribution platform in 27 years. A cloud-based system, choiceEDGE, launched in 2018. The system can integrate with voice search and artificial intelligence.

In 2018, Choice Hotels expanded the number of hotel brands it franchised by acquiring WoodSpring Suites, an extended-stay economy hotel brand. Adding WoodSpring's 240 hotels across the U.S. tripled the number of extended-stay hotels in the company's portfolio to around 350 properties.

, Choice Hotels-branded properties are located in more than 40 countries and territories, including hotels in Europe, Asia-Pacific, the Middle East, and Scandinavia. Choice Hotels entered into an agreement with Spanish hotel operator Sercotel in 2018 to increase Choice's footprint in Spain and Latin America.

On June 13, 2022, Choice Hotels agreed to purchase Radisson Hotels for $675 million.

Corporate affairs
Choice Hotels International is publicly traded on the New York Stock Exchange under the stock symbol CHH. It maintains a corporate headquarters in Rockville, Maryland, and a technology campus in Phoenix, Arizona. At year-end 2017, Choice Hotels employed 1,987 people in its global corporate operations.

Stewart W. Bainum Jr. is chairman of Choice Hotels' board of directors, a position he has held since 1987. Pat Pacious became president and CEO in September 2017. Previously, he served as Choice Hotels' president and chief operating officer.

In 2017, Choice Hotels teamed up with the Red Cross and Boys and Girls Clubs of America in the aftermath of Hurricane Harvey and Hurricane Irma.

Choice Hotels scored 100 on the Human Rights Campaign Foundation's Corporate Equality Index in 2018.

The company's sustainability efforts include Room to be Green, which requires franchised properties to reduce their impact on the environment and lower operating costs with energy-efficient lighting and recycling, and giving guests the option of foregoing daily change of linens. Choice Hotels also participates in Clean the World to recycle hotel soap.

Partnerships
Choice Hotels formed an alliance with Bluegreen Vacations, an international timeshare company, in 2013. Pursuant to this arrangement, many Bluegreen resorts are members of Choice Hotels' Ascend Hotel Collection brand.

Brands

Choice Hotels International is the parent company of a number of hotel brands split among various market segments, in addition to a vacation rentals brand. As of June 30, 2020, Choice Hotels franchised 7,118 properties worldwide, with a total of 597,018 rooms, in addition to 1,035 hotels under construction with 85,129 rooms.

Upscale
 Ascend Hotel Collection
 Cambria Hotels

Midscale
 Comfort (Economy in Norway, Sweden, and Lithuania)
 Clarion Pointe
 Clarion Hotels (upscale in Australia, Norway, Denmark, Sweden, and Finland)
 Quality Inn

Extended stay
 MainStay Suites
 Suburban Extended Stay Hotel
 WoodSpring Suites

Economy
 Econo Lodge
 Rodeway Inn
 Sleep Inn

Vacation rentals
 Vacation Rentals by Choice Hotels

Rewards
Choice Hotels' rewards program is called Choice Privileges. In order to earn points through the program, one must book a reservation by either calling a toll-free number, going online, or using their mobile app. Points are updated the day after the user's stay. To redeem points earned using the program, one must log in on Choice Hotels' website. Points can be redeemed for gift cards or airline mileage.

See also

 Nordic Choice Hotels

References

External links

 

1939 establishments in Florida
American companies established in 1939
Choice Hotels brands
Companies based in Rockville, Maryland
Companies listed on the New York Stock Exchange
Hospitality companies established in 1939
Hospitality companies of the United States
Hotel chains in the United States